Antoniówka may refer to the following places:
Antoniówka, Krasnystaw County in Lublin Voivodeship (east Poland)
Antoniówka, Lubartów County in Lublin Voivodeship (east Poland)
Antoniówka, Gmina Krzczonów in Lublin Voivodeship (east Poland)
Antoniówka, Bełchatów County in Łódź Voivodeship (central Poland)
Antoniówka, Opoczno County in Łódź Voivodeship (central Poland)
Antoniówka, Gmina Wysokie in Lublin Voivodeship (east Poland)
Antoniówka, Tomaszów Lubelski County in Lublin Voivodeship (east Poland)
Antoniówka, Zamość County in Lublin Voivodeship (east Poland)
Antoniówka, Stalowa Wola County in Subcarpathian Voivodeship (south-east Poland)
Antoniówka, Zwoleń County in Masovian Voivodeship (east-central Poland)
Antoniówka, Radom County in Masovian Voivodeship (east-central Poland)